ESPN  football may refer to:

ESPN College Football
List of programs broadcast by ESPN, includes National Football League programs
ESPN NFL Football, American football video game releasedin 2003
ESPN NFL 2K5, American football video game released in 2004 and 2005